Tup is the second studio album by the alternative metal band Loppybogymi.

Track listing
"Debts and Grudges"
"Learn"
"Thrasher Bass"
"Sizzleteeth"
"Kalimba"
"Bongo Dick"
"All in the Destroyed Family"
"The Nibbler"
"Orson"
"Middleworld"
"Underdogs"
"Crater, 6:02 AM"
"Love of Pete"

Remastered Re-issue
The album was remastered and released in 2002. Two songs were added.

"Debts and Grudges"
"Learn"
"Thrasher Bass"
"Sizzleteeth"
"Kalimba"
"Bongo Dick"
"All in the Destroyed Family"
"The Nibbler"
"Orson"
"Middleworld"
"Underdogs"
"Crater, 6:02 AM"
"Love of Pete"
"Run"
"Social Retard"

References

1993 albums